Harisinhji Jaisinhji was the Thakore of Dhrol from 1886 until 1914.

Biography 
He was born in 1845, and succeeded his father, Jaisinhji, on 26 October 1886. He was educated at Rajkumar College in Rajkot. He was kind-hearted and generous ruler. He had erected many public buildings including the Victoria Dispensary, the Prichard Girls’ School, a clock tower and a few temples. He died on 31 July 1914.

Children 
Harisinhji was the father of two sons. They were:

 Dolatsinhji Harisinhji
 Samatsinhji Harisinhji

References 

1845 births
1914 deaths